The 2009 Cork Senior Football Championship was the 121st staging of the Cork Senior Football Championship since its establishment by the Cork County Board in 1887. The draw for the opening fixtures took place on 14 December 2008. The championship began on 18 April 2009 and ended on 9 October 2009.

Nemo Rangers entered the championship as the defending champions, however, they were defeated by Carbery at the quarter-final stage. 

On 27 September 2009, Clonakilty won the championship following a 1-13 to 1-12 defeat of St. Finbarr's in the final. This was their 9th championship title overall and their first title since 1996.

Duhallow's Donncha O'Connor was the championship's top scorer with 3-19.

Team changes

To Championship

Promoted from the Cork Premier Intermediate Football Championship
 St. Finbarr's

From Championship

Relegated to the Cork Premier Intermediate Football Championship
 Bantry Blues

Results

Colleges/divisions section

Round 1

Round 2

Relegation play-offs

Round 3

Quarter-finals

Semi-finals

Final

Championship statistics

Top scorers

Top scorers overall

Top scorers in a single game

Miscellaneous

 Clonakilty win the title for the first time since 1996.
 St. Finbarr's qualify for the final for the first time since 1993

References

External link

 2009 Cork SFC results

Cork Senior Football Championship
Cork Senior Football Championship